Dan Bárta (born 14 December 1969 in Karlovy Vary) is a Czech rock singer. He's a founding member of Alice in 1990 (this band disbanded in 1997). Later he was a member of the short-lived band Sexy Dancers. He also released many solo albums and albums with his band Illustratosphere. He also starred in musicals. Since 1994, he has also been member of J.A.R.

Discography
 Alice (1995) 
 Dan Bárta &… (1999)
 Illustratosphere (2000)
 Entropicture (2003)
 Liberec LiveRec (2005)
 Retropicture Livě (2005)
 Animage (2008)
 Theyories (2010) – with Robert Balzar Trio 
 Maratonika (2013)

References

External links

Official website

1969 births
Living people
20th-century Czech male singers
Musicians from Karlovy Vary
21st-century Czech male singers